Tight is an album by saxophonist Hank Crawford recorded in 1996 and released on the Milestone label.

Reception 

Allmusic's Michael G. Nastos called it: "a clear effort to sell some records" and noted "this commercially inclined recording is all right, not his most essential, but likable in many more spots than not". In JazzTimes, Ron Welburn wrote "Mr. Crawford is immersed in his grooves. Pyrotechnical wails are not associated with his recordings ... Consistency of a groove, however, remains his abiding principle, so much that Hank Crawford seems incapable of spoiling a good thing". On All About Jazz, Douglas Payne stated "Here's a most pleasant surprise from the familiar tenor of Hank Crawford - a terrific collection of familiar soul/jazz tunes worthy of his deeply soulful skills and abundant talent ... a welcome return of one of the most revered sounds in soulful jazz".

Track listing
All compositions by Hank Crawford except where noted
 "I Had a Dream" (Hubert Laws) – 7:23
 "If It's the Last Thing I Do" (Saul Chaplin, Sammy Cahn) – 4:56
 "Breezin'" (Bobby Womack) – 5:56
 "Don't Start Nuttin', Won't Be Nuttin'" (Melvin Sparks) – 7:47
 "Mona Lisa" (Ray Evans, Jay Livingston) – 3:29
 "Little Sunflower" (Freddie Hubbard) – 7:18
 "Everything I Have Is Yours" (Burton Lane, Harold Adamson) – 6:13
 "Manhattan Blues" (Hank Crawford) – 4:37

Personnel
Hank Crawford  – alto saxophone, arranger
Earl Gardner, Alan Rubin – trumpet
David Newman – tenor saxophone, flute
Howard Johnson – baritone saxophone
Danny Mixon – piano, organ
Melvin Sparks – guitar
Stanley Banks - bass
Idris Muhammad − drums

References

Milestone Records albums
Hank Crawford albums
1996 albums
Albums produced by Bob Porter (record producer)
Albums recorded at Van Gelder Studio